The National Service Scheme (NSS) is an Indian government sector public service program conducted by the Ministry of Youth Affairs and Sports of the Government of India. Popularly known as NSS, the scheme was launched in Gandhiji's Centenary year in 1969. Aimed at developing student's personality through community service, NSS is a voluntary association of young people in Colleges, Universities and at +2 level working for a campus-community (esp. Villages) linkage.

History
After independence the University Grants Commission, headed by S. Radhakrishnan, recommended the introduction of voluntary national service in academic institutions. This idea was again considered by the Central Advisory Board of Education (CABE) at its meeting in January, 1950; after examining the idea and the experiences of other countries in this field, the board recommended that students and teachers should devote time to voluntary manual work. In the draft, the first Five-Year Plan adopted by the government in 1952 and the need for social and labour service by Indian students for one year was stressed. In 1958 Jawaharlal Nehru, in a letter to the chief ministers, considered the idea of social service as a prerequisite for graduation. He directed the Ministry of Education to formulate a suitable scheme for the introduction of national service into academic institutions.

Launch of NSS
In May 1969, a conference of student representatives (of universities and institutions of higher education) convened by the Ministry of Education and the University Grants Commission also unanimously agreed that a national-service scheme could be an instrument for national integration. The Planning Commission sanctioned an outlay of ₹5 crores for the NSS during the Fourth Five-Year Plan, stipulating that the NSS be a pilot project in selected institutions and universities. On 24 September 1969, then the Union Education Minister Shri.V.K.R.V. Rao launched the NSS at 37 universities in several states of India. The scheme has been extended to all states and universities in the country, and also +2 level institutes in many states. The then Minister attached to PM of India legendary Smt. Nandini Satpathy had a strong hand in the conceptualisation as well as in the launch of NSS.

Symbol of N.S.S (National Service Scheme)
The symbol for the NSS has been based on the giant Rath Wheel of the world-famous Konark Sun Temple (The Black Pagoda) situated in Odisha, India. The wheel portrays the cycle of creation, preservation and release. It signifies the movement in life across time and space, the symbol thus stands for continuity as well as change and implies the continuous striving of NSS for social change. The eight bars in the wheel represents 24 hours of a day. The red colour indicates that the volunteer is full of young blood that is lively, active, energetic and full of high spirit. The navy blue colour indicates the cosmos of which the NSS is tiny part, ready to contribute its share for the welfare of the mankind.

Aim
The programme aims to instilling the idea of social welfare in students, and to provide service to society without bias. NSS volunteers work to ensure that everyone who is needy gets help to enhance their standard of living and lead a life of dignity. In doing so, volunteers learn from people in villages how to lead a good life despite a scarcity of resources. it also provides help in natural and man-made disasters by providing food, clothing and first aid to the disaster's victims.

Organization and Human Resource Structure
At National level Headquarters,the Directorate of NSS, New Delhi is the Nodal Authority of the NSS Scheme and covers 28 States and 8 UTs across the country. The 15 Regional Directorates are the nodal authority in the regions, which works with state-level NSS cells, within states each university has University level NSS cell under which institutions (schools and colleges) based NSS units operate. Most government and government-aided institutions have volunteer NSS units. Institutions are encouraged to have NSS volunteers. A unit typically comprises 20–40 students (it can be more base on the capacity of institution). They are managed internally by a responsible party from the school or college, who reports to the NSS coordinator. Most institutions do not have a separate uniform for NSS volunteers as one of the great and dedicated toward welfare of India Captain.

New Delhi Headquarters

Shri Pankaj Kumar Singh, Director

Dr. Kamal Kumar Kar , APA

Regional Directorates across the country

Types of Activities
There are two types of activities: Regular Activities(120 hours) and Annual Special Camp(120 hours). All the NSS Volunteers who have served NSS for at least 2 years and have performed 240 hours of work under NSS are entitled to a certificate from the university under the signature of the Vice-Chancellor and the Programme Coordinator.
The Annual camps are known as Special Camps. Camps are held annually, funded by the government of India, and are usually located in a rural village or a city suburb. Volunteers may be involved in such activities as:

Cleaning
Afforestation
Stage shows or a procession creating awareness of issues such as social problems, education and cleanliness
Awareness Rallies
Inviting doctors for health camps
Community Survey
There are no predefined or preassigned tasks; it is left up to the volunteers to provide service in any way that is feasible. Camps typically last between a week and 10 days, although camps for shorter periods are also conducted by NSS.

Themes of the programme
In the past the themes of the Special Camping Programmes have been 
'Youth Against Famine',
'Youth Against Dirt and Disease',
'Youth for Rural Reconstruction',
'Youth for Eco-Development', 'Youth for Mass Literacy', l Harmony',
'Youth for Sustainable Development with special focus on Watershed Management and Wasteland Development' `Healthy Youth For Healthy India`

Other initiatives
In some institutions and colleges volunteers are involved in regular blood donation and traffic control (regulating queues in temples and preventing stampedes at functions). National conferences are held regularly to conduct white-paper and project presentations. and

NSS resembles the Bharat Scouts and Guides, National Cadet Corps (NCC) and other programmes developed for national welfare.

NSS Awards
To recognize the voluntary service rendered by NSS volunteers, Programme Officers (PO's), NSS Units and the University NSS Cells, it has been proposed to provide suitable incentives/ awards under the scheme. Awards include:

 NSS National Award
 State level awards
 University level awards
 District level awards
 College level awards
This award for the appreciable work of the volunteer in the College level camp. and overall performance of the student in the given year.

NSS Manual
 Orientation of students in national problems. 
 Study of philosophy of NSS.
 Basic concepts and components of NSS.
 National service scheme ( NSS) volunteers.
 Special camping programme.
 Fundamental rights, Directive principles of state policy.
 Awareness programme, Consumer awareness, Highlights of consumer act.
 Function literacy non formal education of rural youth.
 Environment enrichment and conservation. 
 Health, family welfare and nutrition.

See also 
 National Cadet Corps (India) (NCC)
 National Police Cadet Corps (India) (NPCC)
 Rashtriya Indian Military College (RIMC)
 Rashtriya Military Schools (RMS)
 Sainik School

References

Further reading 
 National Service Scheme: A Report, by Khwajala Ghulama Saiyidain. Published by Ministry of Education, Govt. of India, 1961.
 Training and consultancy needs in national service scheme, by N. F. Kaikobad, Krishan K. Kapil. Published by the Tata Institute of Social Sciences(TISS), 1971.
 National Service Scheme: guide-lines to project-masters, by Andhra University, Dept. of Sociology & Social Work. Published by Dept. of Sociology & Social Work, Andhra University, 1971.
 National Service Scheme in Gujarat: An Evaluation Report for the Year 1986-87, by Tata Institute of Social Sciences Training Orientation & Research Centre (NSS), India, India. Dept. of Youth Affairs and Sports. Published by The Centre, 1987.
 National Service Scheme in Maharashtra: An Evaluation Report for the Year 1986-87, by Tata Institute of Social Sciences Training Orientation & Research Centre (NSS), India, India Dept. of Youth Affairs and Sports. Published by The Centre, 1988.
 National Service Scheme in India: A Case Study of Karnataka, by M. B. Dilshad. Published by Trust Publications, 2001.

External links

National Service Scheme website
NSS Unit 8 Instagram Handle

Ministry of Youth Affairs and Sports
Youth organisations based in India
Education in India
Government schemes in India
1969 establishments in India